The Sint Maarten national football team represents Sint Maarten in international football under the control of the Sint Maarten Football Federation. After its creation in 1986, the association became an associate member of CONCACAF, the region's governing body, on 21 April 2002. It became a full member in 2013. Sint Maarten is also a member of the Caribbean Football Union and has played in the sub-confederation's tournaments since 1989. Sint Maarten is not a member of FIFA as of August 2022. The national side did not play a single senior international fixture for nearly sixteen years between 2000 and 2016.

Below are the results of all of Sint Maarten's official matches.

International matches

All-time record 
Key

 Pld = Matches played
 W = Matches won
 D = Matches drawn
 L = Matches lost

 GF = Goals for
 GA = Goals against
 GD = Goal differential
 Countries are listed in alphabetical order

As of 23 December 2022

References

External links 
RSSSF List of Matches
ELO List of Matches
National Football Teams List of Matches
Soccerway List of Matches

Football in Sint Maarten